Fatama , also known as Fatima, is an unincorporated community in Wilcox County, Alabama, United States.

History
The origin of the name Fatama is unknown, but is possibly derived from Fátima, Portugal. A post office operated under the name Fatama from 1855 to 1914.

References

Unincorporated communities in Alabama
Unincorporated communities in Wilcox County, Alabama